The Harvest of Hope Foundation is a 501(c)(3) non-profit foundation which provides emergency and educational financial relief to migrant farmworkers and their families. Federal, state and other public aid to migrant farmworkers has become increasingly restrictive, and in many cases, not available at all. The goal of the Harvest of Hope Foundation is to fill in the gaps in service to this most hard-working and deserving, yet needy group of laborers.

History

Although the Harvest of Hope Foundation is currently based out of Gainesville, Florida, it was founded by Philip Kellerman in 1997 in Oneonta, New York. The foundation was established through an inheritance from Kellerman's grandmother, Dr. Helen Zand (1901–1995)- the first female accepted to the law school of Cornell University and a long time social worker and advocate for the indigent.  In honor and memory of his grandmother, Kellerman wanted to continue the tradition of social service work by forming the foundation in order to assist mobile field laborers of fruits, vegetables and other foods.

There is a significance to the organization's name. In the field of migrant education, the words “harvesting” and “harvesting hope” are used frequently for those who advocate for the educational, social and health needs of migrant workers.

Organization
The Harvest of Hope Foundation is a non-profit 501(c)(3) foundation which is tax exempt as defined under the IRS guidelines. It is composed of a board of directors with over 100 combined years in migrant education and human services.

Board
Phil Kellerman, President, Gainesville, Florida.Kellerman began his work with migrant farmworkers when he became employed with the Eastern Stream Center of Resources and Training (ESCORT) in 1989 at the State University of New York at Oneonta in Oneonta.  ESCORT is involved in providing technical assistance to states, regions, school districts and schools serving children of migrant farmworkers. In 1995, Kellerman was the first staff person at ESCORT who responded to calls in English and Spanish on the National Migrant Education Hotline. However, funds to manage the hotline could not be used to provide emergency financial aid to callers for such things as transportation repairs, housing, utilities and funeral expenses. Thus, in 1997, Kellerman established the Harvest of Hope Foundation to provide financial assistance to hotline callers and other migrant farmworkers and families.
Tom Romero, Vice President, Gainesville, FL. Romero began his dedicated involvement with the foundation in 2005 by volunteering his talented digital art design and website programming services to help support migrant farmworkers and further the mission of the Harvest of Hope Foundation. Motivated to expand the foundation's internet presence and digital outreach, Tom is always adapting and refining our internet presence which now includes social media awareness outreach to thousands of donors and supporters nationwide. Consistent and reliable, Tom offers day to day support with various functional everyday operations within the foundation. His duties also include promotional strategies; partnered network coordination; team building, marketing strategies; fundraising strategies; enhancing donor outreach; help generate awareness about our cause; provide print/web graphic designs; and serves as the Foundation's liaison to the St. johns County Tourism Development Council for the annual charity fundraiser Harvest of Hope Fest at the St. Johns County Fairgrounds in St. Augustine, Florida. Tom is a native Floridian from Jacksonville Beach who graduated from Santa Fe College in Gainesville, Florida. He holds an A.A. in Business Management and A.S. in Graphic Design Technologies. Now residing as a Gainesville, Tom is deeply connected to the cause of migrant farmworkers due to his eye opening experiences and long-term commitment to his partner and her extended immigrant Mexican family. Through them he has become keenly aware of the adversities they faced during their immigration to the United States and the hardships they encountered to have the life that they now cherish.
Dina Sevayega, Treasurer, Latham, New York.Sevayega was born the child of Hispanic migrant farmworkers in Texas, and thus has lived the migrant experience in full. She overcame many moves and disruptions to her education as a youth to obtain her doctorate. She is currently an Associate in Higher Education/Teacher Education in the New York State Education Department. For four years, Sevayega has been involved in a service learning project at the State University of New York at Oneonta, where she shares her migrant experiences with students preparing to be teachers and who organize activities to raise funds for the Harvest of Hope Foundation.
Ed Kellerman, Communications Director, Gainesville, Florida.Since 1992, Kellerman has been a senior lecturer in the Dial Center for Written and Oral Communication at the University of Florida. His specialty is intercultural communication and organizational leadership. Kellerman also serves as the communications director for the foundation. He was a Peace Corps volunteer who worked as a speech therapist in Malaysia.
DigitalGreg, Public Relations Specialist, Plantation, Florida.Working in various areas of public relations since he was 16, DigitalGreg chose public relations as his major at the University of Florida. During his senior year, while working toward his bachelor’s degree, DigitalGreg was asked by Ed Kellerman to join the Harvest of Hope Foundation as a public relations intern. The internship which started in January 2009 lead to his promotion as the foundation's public relations specialist. Prior to working for the Harvest of Hope Foundation, DigitalGreg worked in Broward County, Florida for the Hazmat Crew and Lexicon Productions promoting raves. He also was the special events leader for over three years while working for the City of Plantation, Florida. He helped plan an average of 18 events per year.

Mission
The Harvest of Hope Foundation's mission is to provide humanitarian support  and emergency financial assistance to migrant farmworkers and their families. It is the goal of the Harvest of Hope Foundation to fill in the gaps by providing basic humanitarian services to hard-working, yet needy migrant farmworkers. The foundation provides migrant farmworkers and their families with emergency  funding and assistance for automobile breakdowns, utility shutoffs, rent payments, medical situations and funeral expenses. The Harvest of Hope Foundation also issues grants to small businesses and organizations that provide social services and assistance to migrant farmworkers.

The Harvest of Hope Foundation provides educational scholarships to children of migrant farmworkers to attend college or other post-secondary education. The Foundation also houses and manages 42 funds on behalf of migrant farmworkers and families.

The Harvest of Hope Foundation works closely with teachers, social workers and advocates of migrant workers to coordinate the services and the distribution of financial aid.  The Foundation President, Philip Kellerman conducts regular meetings and workshops throughout the country with educators, migrant advocates and state officials who are involved with social services to migrants.

The Harvest of Hope Foundation accepts monetary donations as well as donations of antiques, collectibles and memorabilia to sell to raise funds.  Harvest of Hope welcomes individuals to organize and conduct fund-raising events.

As of May 2010, the Harvest of Hope Foundation has distributed more than $812,000 in emergency and educational aid to migrant farmworkers and families across the country.

Services
The Harvest of Hope Foundation works to:
Support migrant farmworkers and their families with emergency aid
Issue small grants to programs that assist migrant families
Provides financial aid to migrant students attending college and other post-secondary educational institutions
Heighten awareness of the plight of migrant farmworkers in the country
Coordinate with agencies assisting migrant families and their children with education, social services and medical needs

The Harvest of Hope Foundation now houses 42 funds to provide financial aid to select migrant farmworkers or to designated geographic regions.

Housing: Often it is difficult for migrant farmworkers to find housing or to pay rent. When they are in need of emergency housing or could use help with late rent, the Harvest of Hope Foundation assists  financially in order to help the migrants secure safe housing for themselves and their families.

Transportation: If a migrant worker experiences a breakdown in their only form of transportation, the Harvest of Hope Foundation will help in paying for repairs. The organization also gives aid in the form of gas money, bus tickets and raises funds to buy cars for those who need them.

Medical: Many migrant farmworkers can not afford to pay for medical services, however with the help of the foundation, many of the families are able to afford necessary medical services- such as dental            care or surgery. Currently, the foundation works to give funds to over 11 different foundations in the forms of emergency aid.

Education: Many migrant farmworkers' children are in need of aid to fund their educations. The Harvest of Hope Foundation raises money to assist those migrant students in their educational endeavors, from grade school to post secondary institutions.

Finance
Since its establishment, The Harvest of Hope Foundation has distributed more than $812,000 in emergency and educational financial aid to migrant farmworkers.  Eighty (80) cents of every donated dollar goes to provide direct emergency and educational aid. Ten-twelve (10-12) cents of every dollar is used for administrative expenses. Only eight (8) cents of every dollar goes to the foundation’s president for his full-time work managing and maintaining the Harvest of Hope Foundation. These percentages are well balanced as compared to other non-profit organizations.

Because the Harvest of Hope Foundation receives more requests for aid than funds allow, the foundation has strict procedures for the distribution of funds. Individuals who request aid must show that they are willing to help themselves.   Harvest of Hope Foundation provides a “helping-hand”, not a “hand-out.”

The foundation works closely with teachers, social workers and advocates of migrant workers to coordinate the services and the distribution of money. Payments are typically made to landlords, mechanics, funeral homes and other service providers, and usually not to the individuals in need.

Charity fundraising
The Harvest of Hope Foundation is unique in that it is one of the few foundations which provides “direct services” in the form of immediate financial aid. This has proved detrimental in the foundation securing other foundation or corporate financial support that have policies prohibiting financial support to organizations providing “direct services.” As a result, the Harvest of Hope Foundation has raised funds in a variety of ways which have included the following:
 Music events such as the Harvest of Hope Fest
 Individual donations
 Sales of Sweetwater Organic, Fair Trade Coffee
 Donations of stock
 A donated automobile
 A foundation eBay account which sells donated collectibles and other memorabilia
 Student service learning fundraisers which have included bake sales, concerts, car washes, restaurant events, raffles, pancake breakfasts and more.
 Sales of antiques at an antique shop in Central Florida.
 Donations made by shopping online via Good Shop
 Donations made through searches conducted online via GoodSearch

Affiliations and sponsors
Against Me! (5 events) Gainesville, Florida's punk band, Against Me!, has teamed up with the Harvest of Hope Foundation multiple times to help raise money and awareness for the foundation.

Spanish Gamble (f.k.a Dirt Money) is a band based out of Gainesville, Florida which has played several shows to raise funds for the Harvest of Hope Foundation.

No Idea Records & Ryan Murphy is an independent record label that helps the Harvest of Hope Foundation with many of its benefit shows. Ryan Murphy, the distribution manager at No Idea Records, is the mastermind behind the Harvest of Hope Fest.

GraphicDesignsbyTom.com  Graphic artist and Web site designer, Tom R. Romero of Gainesville's GraphicDesignsByTom.com became interested in the Harvest of Hope Foundation in 2004.  Romero first heard about the foundation from a local radio broadcast which featured a segment that described the important emergency services the Harvest of Hope Foundation provided to migrant farmworkers and their families. Romero decided to contact the foundation to see if he could volunteer his graphic art abilities. Between 2004-2006, Romero continued to support the Harvest of Hope Foundation by devising advertising and marketing support material. In 2007, Romero partnered with Spearhead Media, a Gainesville web hosting company,  to donate Web site hosting space for the redesign of  the Harvest of Hope Foundation Web site. After the new Web site project was complete, in 2009, Romero started a new project that provided graphic support and print design services to the Harvest of Hope Foundation's 1st annual Harvest of Hope Fest. To date, Romero is still producing print designs that include a series of marketing brochures featuring photographs from Colorado photographer Celia Roberts.

Spearhead Media, based in Gainesville, Florida, specializes in high quality Web site design, hosting and development. Spearhead Media also provides support services, e-commerce and content management tools for micro, small and medium-sized businesses. In 2005, Spearhead Media, in affiliation with GraphicDesignsByTom.com, partnered to donate Web site hosting services to the Harvest of Hope Foundation. It is now the official web hosting provider for the foundation.

DigitalGreg.com provides a small portion of photographic images and graphic design to the Harvest of Hope Foundation. Many of these photographs and graphics can be viewed on his Web site.

Sweetwater Organic Coffee Company (Sweetwater), Gainesville, Florida’s sustainable coffee roaster, has donated coffee to the foundation to help raise funds. The company has also named a blend after the foundation, Harvest of Hope.

Celia Roberts is a professional photographer/artist whose work reveals her interest in and sensitivity to nature, as well as special cultures and populations in developing countries and the U.S. All the farmworker photos which the Harvest of Hope Foundation use in its printed documents and Web site are used in courtesy of Celia Roberts.

A Antique Mall is located in Reddick, FL just off Interstate 75 near Micanopy. It offers a wide variety of collectibles and antiques. Proceeds from sales at the Harvest of Hope Booth are donated to the foundation.

Related
The plight of migrant farmworkers was first documented in the 1960 documentary Harvest of Shame presented by CBS news anchor Edward R. Murrow.

References

Non-profit organizations based in Florida